The first season of The Voice + premiered on TV Globo on January 17, 2021 in the  (BRT / AMT) daytime slot.

On April 4, 2021, 63 year-old Zé Alexanddre from Team Claudia Leitte won the competition with 39.40% of the final vote over Catarina Neves (Team Daniel), Dudu França (Team Ludmilla) and Leila Maria (Team Mumuzinho).

Teams
 Key

Blind auditions
Key

Playoffs

Showdowns

Final Shows

Week 1: Semifinals

Week 2: Finals

Elimination chart
Key

Results

Ratings and reception

Brazilian ratings
All numbers are in points and provided by Kantar Ibope Media.

References

External links
The Voice + on Gshow.com

+ 1
2021 Brazilian television seasons